Waldo Hutchins (September 30, 1822 – February 8, 1891) was a New York attorney, businessman and politician. He served in the New York State Assembly and as a Member of Congress.

Biography
Born in Brooklyn, Connecticut, Hutchins graduated from Amherst College in 1842.  He studied law, was admitted to the bar in 1845 and commenced practice in New York City.

He served as a member of the New York State Assembly in 1852. From 1857 to 1869 Hutchins was a member of the Central Park board of commissioners.  He was a delegate to the State constitutional convention in 1867.

Hutchins was elected as a Democrat to the Forty-sixth Congress to fill the vacancy caused by the death of Alexander Smith. He was reelected to the Forty-seventh and Forty-eighth Congresses and served from November 4, 1879 to March 3, 1885. He was not a candidate for renomination in 1884 and resumed the practice of law in New York City.

In 1887, Hutchins was again appointed to New York City's Central Park Commission. He served until his death in New York City on February 8, 1891.  He was interred at Woodlawn Cemetery in the Bronx.

In New York City's Central Park, overlooking Conservatory Water, is the Waldo Hutchins bench, a curved Concord white granite exedra outdoor bench. The cost of the bench was $15,000 ($ in current dollar terms). Its architect was Eric Gugler, and in 1932 it was executed by the Piccirilli Brothers studio, the firm that carved the Lincoln Memorial in Washington, D.C.

Family
Hutchins was married to Elizabeth Ellsworth, the daughter of William Wolcott Ellsworth and granddaughter of Oliver Ellsworth.  They were the parents of four children—Julia Sterling (1855-1930), Augustus Schell (1856-1948), Waldo (1858-1933), and William Ellsworth (1861-1916).

References

Sources

Books

Internet

Newspapers

Magazines

External sources

1822 births
1891 deaths
Amherst College alumni
New York (state) lawyers
Democratic Party members of the New York State Assembly
Democratic Party members of the United States House of Representatives from New York (state)
Burials at Woodlawn Cemetery (Bronx, New York)
19th-century American politicians
People from Brooklyn, Connecticut
19th-century American lawyers